The Auvergne gudgeon (Gobio alverniae) is a species of gudgeon, a small freshwater in the family Cyprinidae. It is found in the upper Loire, Dordogne, Lot and Tarn drainages in France.

References

 

Gobio
Fish described in 2005
Cyprinid fish of Europe